Samuel James Barratt (born 25 August 1995) is an English professional footballer who plays as a winger for Maidenhead United.

Career

Early career
Barratt started his career in the youth team at Woodley Town before joining Bracknell Town in 2011 aged 15. Barratt scored on his first team debut as a 16 year old and went on to play "approximately 90 games" for the Robins. In summer 2014, Barratt signed for Maidenhead United. During four seasons at the club he made 97 league appearances - scoring 12 goals - and was part of the team that won the National League South in 2016-17. He combined his non-league football career with his job as an artist. He also had trials at Crystal Palace and Bristol Rovers, as well as a loan spell at Staines Town in December 2016.

Southend United
In May 2018 it was announced that he would turn professional with Southend United for the 2018–19 season. He made his English Football League debut on the opening day of the season as a substitute in a 2-3 defeat at home to Doncaster Rovers. This was his only appearance before sustaining a "long-term" knee injury in August 2018. Barratt returned to the senior team on 1 January 2020 against AFC Wimbledon.
He left Southend on 22 August 2020, having made ten appearances during his time in Essex.

Return to Maidenhead United
Barratt re-joined Maidenhead on 14 September 2020. After scoring fifteen goals in his first season back with the club, Barratt signed a two-year contract extension in June 2021.

International career
Barratt was called up to the England C team in November 2017 and made his debut against Slovakia. He also played against Wales in March 2018.

Career statistics

References

1995 births
Living people
English footballers
England semi-pro international footballers
Woodley United F.C. players
Bracknell Town F.C. players
Maidenhead United F.C. players
Staines Town F.C. players
Southend United F.C. players
English Football League players
National League (English football) players
Isthmian League players
Association football wingers